Tropiocolotes tripolitanus, also known as the northern sand gecko or Tripoli gecko, is a species of gecko found in northern Africa.

References

tripolitanus
Reptiles described in 1880
Taxa named by Wilhelm Peters